Valaská is a village and municipality in Brezno District, in the Banská Bystrica Region of central Slovakia.

Nature
The Horné Lazy nature reserve is located north of the village.

External links
Picture of Village
Official homepage

Villages and municipalities in Brezno District